The 1983 Campeonato Nacional was Chilean football league top tier’s  51st season. Colo-Colo was the tournament’s champion, winning its fourteenth title. There was no relegation, in order to increase the number of teams for the next season.

League table

Results

Topscorer

Liguilla Pre-Copa Libertadores

See also
 1983 Copa Polla Gol
 1983 Copa República

References

External links 
ANFP 
RSSSF Chile 1983

Primera División de Chile seasons
Chile
1983 in Chilean football